Adansi is the name of an Akan ethnic group inhabiting the Ashanti Region of Ghana. The capital of the Adansi is at Fomena. An Adansihene (king of Adansi) is still designated. The Adansi  has seven paramountcies: the capital, Fomena, New Edubiase, Ayaase, Akrokyere (Akrokerri), Akrofuom, Bodwesango and, Dompoase. The Adansi  is devolved into three local government divisions - Adansi South which has a population of 129,325 and an area of 1,380 square kilometres has the capital at New Edubiase; Adansi North has a population of 235,680, and an area 828 square kilometres and has its capital at Fomena; and Obuasi Municipal which has a population of 175,043 and is the second-largest urban settlement in the Ashanti Region and the eight biggest urban settlement in Ghana. Adansi South was once the largest cocoa growing area in the Ashanti Region.

History 
The Adansi land stretches from the Pra River to the south to the Asante paramountcy of Bekwai to the north. It is also bound to the southwest by the Twi-speaking Denkyera tribe. According to imminent historian F.K.Buah, the Adansiland is considered the origin of some Akan people. In the 17th century, the Adansi were powerful people known for their ability to build beautiful structures. The Akan office of Okyeame (linguist) is said to have originated in Adansi.

Obuasi
Obuasi is a town in the southern Ashanti Region and is the capital of Obuasi Municipal, a district lying south of Kumasi in the Ashanti Region. Obuasi is the second-largest urban settlement in the Ashanti Region and the eighth-most populous settlement in terms of population, with a population of 168,641 people, according to Ghana's 2010 Population and Housing Census. It is the largest settlement of the Adansi people.

Situated on the railway line from Kumasi to Sekondi, it is known for its Obuasi Gold Mine, now one of the nine largest on Earth, gold having been mined on the site since at least the seventeenth century.

References

Geography of Ghana
Ashanti Region
Ethnic groups in Ghana